Agudas Chassidei Chabad is the umbrella organization for the worldwide Chabad-Lubavitch movement. The chairman of the executive committee is Rabbi Abraham Shemtov.

History

Agudas Chasidei Chabad was established by the sixth Lubavitcher Rebbe, Rabbi Yosef Yitzchok Schneersohn in 1923. In the letter the Rebbe Rayatz wrote to Rabbi Eliyahu Yochil Simpson, a
Lubavitcher Rav in New York about this new Aguda in a letter dated 6 Kislev, 5686/1925. He wrote that Divine Providence had caused Chassidim who had learned in Lubavitch to go to America in order
to inspire Chassidim and mekuravim in that country who never saw the Rebbeim: 
"I have asked twice and three times that the talmidim, rabbanim, shochtim the balabatim correspond with one another, to inspire each other with a proper arousal. With
the same feeling and pleasure that
they merited to enjoy from the light
which is good, when they stood in
the holy chamber of [the Rebbe
Rashab], who toiled and worked
exceedingly hard to endow them
with bountiful good and the dew of
resurrection through numerous
sayings [which are] holy of holies;
so that they would shine forth like
stars in the sky in all their beings,
for good and blessing."

"You dear students … upon
whom Hashgacha Elyona decreed
that you go to a distant land, a
place where they did not see the
light of tzaddikim, our fathers the
holy Rebbeim. Even for the elders,
may they live long, it is many years
that they have not been in the
chambers of holiness, and the
young ones never saw anything.
Therefore, upon you and only upon
you, devolves the obligation and
mitzva to fulfill the great mission
to inspire them and draw them to
the light which is good."'''

Then the Rebbe calls upon the
Tmimim to unite:
"Unite, our dear talmidim, unite.
Awaken, awaken and rise up and illuminate with the light
which is good and the merit
of our fathers, the holy
Rebbeim, should cast a tent
upon you and the members
of your households, on those
who learn and support, on
them, their households and
children, and all they have
should be blessed with
unlimited blessings from
spirit to flesh."

The founding meeting of
the Aguda (association) took
place at Rabbi Simpson's
house on Motzaei Shabbos,
Parshas Shmini, the eve of 27
Nissan, and was attended by
about ten Lubavitcher
Chassidim who had learned in
Tomchei Tmimim in
Lubavitch. 
The following are
the minutes of the meeting:
“The purpose of the Aguda
is for all the Tmimim in the United
States to unite in one bond, heart
and soul, physically and spiritually,
to arouse the spark of love and spirit
that they had when they were
together in Lubavitch.”

A book was chosen to record the
minutes of the Aguda. At the
beginning there was a paper on
which they signed their agreement of
the founding of the Agudas
HaT’mimim, which read as follows:
“Boruch Hashem, Motzaei
Shabbos kodesh Parshas Shmini,
5686, New York.

"We the undersigned have gathered
together for a meeting of Tmimim at
the home of Rabbi Simpson and we
have decided with a resolute decision
to unite together in one association,
heart and soul, and to meet once a
month, bli neder, at the home of one
of the Tmimim, to learn Chassidus
and to farbreng. It is the obligation
of each member to involve himself in
all matters of commitment to the
association materially and spiritually,
bli neder, and also to involve himself
in the welfare of our mosdos and the
welfare of the Rebbe shlita, bli neder.
“Eliyahu Simpson, 
Gershon Simpson, 
Alter Beilin,
Yisroel
Jacobson,
Zev Wolf Koznitz,
Avner
Shifrin,
Yosef Nelson,
Yitzchok Schneiderman,
Gershon Chanoch Hecharin .”

In 1940, upon his arrival in the United States, he assumed the role of President and in 1941, upon the arrival of his son-in-law, Rabbi Menachem M. Schneerson, he appointed him as executive chairman. Its initial purpose was to "unify the Chasidim (adherents) of Chabad;  to establish ordinances in every Chabad synagogue concerning the communal study of Chasidus... To establish Cheders for children and with God-fearing teachers. To establish Yeshivot for students to learn, from whom Torah may spread forth... and to support the organizations founded by the previous (Chabad) Rebbes."

After the passing of Rabbi Yosef Yitzchok Schneersohn in 1950, his son-in-law, Rabbi Menachem M. Schneerson succeeded him as President of Agudas Chassidei Chabad. Since then, Agudas Chassidei Chabad has served as the umbrella organization for the Chabad Lubavitch movement.

In 1984, Rabbi Schneerson selected several new people to serve on the board. After their appointments, the board consisted of the following:

 Rabbi Menachem M. Schneerson, President.
 Chaim Mordechai Hodakov, vice-president.
 Avraham Shemtov, chairman.
 Nissan Mindel, Treasurer. 
 Yehuda Krinsky, Secretary.
 Dovid Raskin
 Moshe Pinchas Katz
 Moshe Herson
 J.J. Hecht

In March 1990, the documents were once again modified and Rabbi Schneerson selected a total of twenty-two individuals to serve as members on the board of the umbrella organization:

 Rabbi Menachem M. Schneerson, President.
 Chaim Mordechai Hodakov, vice-president.
 Avraham Shemtov, chairman.
 Nissan Mindel, Treasurer. 
 Yehuda Krinsky, Secretary.
 Benjamin Goredetzky
 Menachem Shmuel Dovid Raichik
 Dovid Raskin
 Moshe Herson
 Shlomo Cunin
 Sholom Marozov
 Ephraim Wolff
 Nachman Sudak
 Joseph Weinberg
 Sholom Mendel Simpson
 Benjamin Levetin
 Shimon Goldman
 Zev Kasinetz
 Joshuah Korf
 Joshua Pinson
 Shmuel Fox
 Zev Katz

Ownership of 770 Eastern Parkway
In 2010, a New York judge ruled in favor of Agudas Chasidei Chabad, deciding over an ownership dispute between the organization and the Gabbayim of the synagogue housed at 770 Eastern Parkway. The court ordered the Gabbayim to deliver possession of the premises of 770 Eastern Parkway to Agudas Chasidei Chabad.

Library of Agudas Chassidei Chabad

During World War II, Rabbi Yosef Yitzchak was forced to flee from the USSR and went to Poland. He was given permission by the Soviet government to take many of his religious texts from his library with him. In March 1940, Rabbi Yosef Yitzchak managed to escape Europe for the United States, but was forced to leave his library behind. In the 1970s, many of the texts were recovered in Poland and were returned to Chabad. Today, the chief librarian is Rabbi Shalom Dovber Levine and contains over 250,000 books.

References

External links
 Library of Agudas Chassidei Chabad

Chabad in the United States
Chabad organizations
Jewish-American history
Jewish organizations established in 1924